The 1993 Miami Hooters season was the second season for the franchise, as their first season in Miami, Florida after moving from Sacramento, California. They finished 5–7 and lost in the 1st round of the AFL playoffs to the Tampa Bay Storm.

Regular season

Schedule

Standings

z – clinched homefield advantage

y – clinched division title

x – clinched playoff spot

Playoffs

External links
1993 Miami Hooters on ArenaFan.com

1993 Arena Football League season
Florida Bobcats seasons
1993 in sports in Florida